Mian Zia ur Rehman is a Pakistani politician from Mansehra District. He is a former member of the Khyber Pakhtunkhwa Assembly belong to the Pakistan Muslim League (N). He also served as a member of different committees.

Political career
Khan was elected to the Khyber Pakhtunkhwa Assembly as a candidate of Pakistan Muslim League (N) (PML-N) from PK-54 (Mansehra-II) in 2013 Pakistani general election.

He was re-elected to the Khyber Pakhtunkhwa Assembly as a candidate of PML-N from Constituency PK-30 (Mansehra-I) in 2018 Pakistani general election.

In October 2018, The Supreme Court of Pakistan disqualified him as member of the Khyber Pakhtunkhwa Assembly for contesting elections with a fake degree.

References

Living people
Year of birth missing (living people)
Pashtun people
Pakistan Muslim League (N) MPAs (Khyber Pakhtunkhwa)
Khyber Pakhtunkhwa MPAs 2013–2018
People from Mansehra District